Spätzla, Spätzle [ˈʃpɛtslə] or Spatzen are Swabian or Alemannic pasta of an elongated shape which is served as a side dish or with other ingredients as a main dish. Similar pasta of a rotund shape is called Knöpfle in Baden-Württemberg and in Bavarian Swabia.
 
Spätzle are egg-based pasta made with fresh egg of an irregular form with a rough, porous surface. The glutinous dough is put directly into boiling water or steam and the form varies between thin and thick, elongated and short. They are the only pasta that is cooked for the first time during the fabrication. The moist dough is either pressed through a perforated metal plate or it drips through this plate into the boiling water. Other ways to prepare Spätzle are more applicable for domestic use.

Name
Spätzle is the Swabian diminutive of Spatz and possibly means “sparrow” or “clump”. Spätzle used in this context stands in plural form. In the 18th century this dish was referred to as "Wasserspatzen" (engl. water sparrows). In Switzerland and in Markgräflerland (Margraves’ Land) the dish is called "Spätzli" or "Chnöpfli" and in the Low Alemannic area "Knepfli". There is an equivalent and common dish in Hungary ("nokedli" and also "galuska" – whereas both terms are naturalised loanwords) and Slovakia ("galuska" or "halušky") with Austria connecting both cultures. In Northern Austria, Spätzle are called "Nockerln" (as in the dish Eiernockerl) whereas dumplings are also referred to as "Nocken" in Carinthia and Tyrol.

The name probably refers to the form of the Spätzle in the 18th century, which was compared to the shape of the sparrow. Some linguists derive it from the word “clump”, meaning dough which tends to form clots.

Depending on the form, some regions differentiate between Spätzle (the length exceeds the diameter around more than the fourfold) and Knöpfle (the relation of length to diameter is under two). Spätzle which went wrong, which are very lumpy or stick together are also called “raven”, “little stork”, “black horse”, “nightingale”, “grandfather” or “eagle”.

History and meaning
The history of Spätzle and Knöpfle in Swabia goes back centuries and is very important to Swabian cuisine. 
In Swabian literature, there is a multitude of poems about “the favourite dish of the Swabian people”. Examples are poems such as "Das Lob der Schwabenknöpfle" (The Praise of Swabian Knöpfle) which was published in the regional newspaper Schwarzwälder Bote (Black Forest Messenger) in 1838, the poem "Schwäbische Leibspeisa" (The Swabian Favourite Dish) or the “Spätzles-Lied” (The Spätzle Song).

The manufacturing of Spätzle in Swabia can be traced back to the 18th century. 
In 1725 the Württembergian council and private physician Lentilius defined "Knöpflein" and "Spatzen" as "everything that is made from flour". Back then, spelt was widely used in Swabia and Alemannia. 
Since the region was marked by rural peasant structures and poverty, the undemanding grain spelt was very popular since it also thrives in low-nutrient soil. 
Spelt is high in gluten, so in times of scarcity it could be made into a dough without the addition of eggs. Consequently, it is the flour most commonly used in the preparation of Spätzle.

Traditionally, Spätzle are scraped manually on a board, which is still considered a special certification mark. For efficiency reasons, a mechanical production of "homemade" Spätzle comparable with manually scraped ones emerged at the start of the 20th century. With the beginning of industrialisation and progressing prosperity, Spätzle advanced from everyday food to a delicacy eaten during the holidays. People from a Swabian farming village called it a festive dish in 1937. One year prior, regional poet Sebastian Blau (Josef Eberle's pseudonym) rendered Spätzle a symbol of Swabian identity: "… Spätzle are the foundation of our cuisine, the glory of our country, … the be-all and end-all of the Swabian menu…".

Nowadays, Swabian Spätzle or Knöpfle can be found in nearly every product ranges of Swabian pasta producers and since the 1980s, they also have been successfully exported. They are mentioned in many Swabian traditions and celebrations and also form part of tourist activities in terms of culinary specialty weeks or courses, seminars and competitions where Spätzle are scraped (made). There are many cooking competitions and various world records in "Spätzleschaben" (Spätzle scraping). A number of exhibitions document the traditional knowledge of the making of Spätzle in the Swabian region from the very beginnings until today.  The great importance of Spätzle for the Swabian kitchen is proofed by the novel Die Geschichte von den sieben Schwaben (The history of the seven Swabians), published in 1827, according to which in Swabia exists the tradition "of eating five times a day, which means five times soup, and two times the soup is accompanied by Knöpfle or Spätzle".

In 1892, Elise Henle explained that a Swabian woman should be able to manufacture Spätzle: "s isch koi richtigs Schwobe-Mädla, des net Spätzla kocha ka" ("t'is not a real Swabian girl, who isn't able to cook Spätzle"). For the modern era the Swabian author Siegfried Ruoß lists more than 50 different Spätzle recipes in his cookbook "Schwäbische Spätzleküche". In Bad Waldsee, in upper-Swabia, there is a Spätzle museum since 2013.

The earliest recipes for Spätzle can be found in the so-called "Göppinger Kochbuch", which was composed by Rosina Dorothea Knör (1733–1809) in 1783.

Pastry ingredients and preparation of Spätzle

Ingredients
The Spätzle dough is made from flour, eggs, lukewarm water, in some places also with milk, and salt. The measurements, however, can vary. Spätzle flour which is sold in retail is often coarse wheat flour type 405 (German standard), in some cases mixed with spelt flour or fine semolina since it prevents the dough from going lumpy.

Preparation
In contrast to a kneaded pasta dough, Spätzle dough is stirred and therefore softer and moister. For the further preparation, there are several different ways:
Scraped: Traditionally, the fresh dough is placed on a moist, ideally tilted board. From there it is scraped in thin stripes into the boiling salt water. This traditional way is elaborate and requires practice.
Pressed: With a Spätzle press, the dough is pressed vertically into the water forming long and even Spätzle.
Shredded: There are different kinds of Spätzlehobel (planes) producing either thick and short Spätzle (Knöpfle) or long Spätzle.
A new way of making Spätzle are Spätzle sieves.
After the Spätzle are cooked, they swim to the top and can be removed with a skimmer. They shouldn't be rinsed with water but served hot instead.

There are also premade Spätzle which come in either dry or frozen form and can be boiled directly in hot water.

Spätzle dishes
 Apple Spätzle: a sweet variant, which can be found in the Allgäu and in the region of the Lake Constance. Steamed slices of apple or rather stewed apple are added to roasted Spätzle which is then sprinkled with sugar or cinnamon. 
 Roast Spätzle: are baked until golden brown and are a pure soup ingredient.
 Brätspätzle soup: soup with roasted Spätzle.
 Spelt Spätzle: are made of spelt flour.
 Egg Spätzle: The Spätzle are tossed in a pan with melted butter and are mixed with scrambled eggs. 
 Spicy Spätzle stew: minced meat, onions and cabbage or rather chicory are brought to the boil and are mixed with Spätzle.
 “Gaisburger Marsch”: a traditional Swabian stew with Spätzle.
 Hazelnut Spätzle: roasted and with ground hazelnuts.
 Potato Spätzle: grated, cooked potatoes are added to the Spätzle dough. 
 Cheese Spätzle: probably the most famous Spätzle dish. It has a particular tradition in Swabia, in the Allgäu and in Vorarlberg, where it is known as “Käsknöpfle”. Many of these variants have something in common: Spätzle, onions and different types of cheese are layered. Typical types of cheese are Emmental and mountain cheese, but also Limburger cheese, beer cheese or Vorarlberg mountain cheese. Supplements are usually green salads or potato salad. In the uplands of Vorarlberg or in Liechtenstein, it is common to add applesauce. Rests of Cheese Spätzle can be fried in a pan with butter.
 Herbal-Spätzle: finely chopped herbs, as parsley, lovage, tarragon or sorrel are added to the Spätzle dough.
 Cabbage Spätzle: Spätzle are heated together with Sauerkraut and bacon in a pan until the cabbage gets partly brown.
 Liver Spätzle: consist of a dough, which additionally contains pureed, raw liver. They are served with fried onions or are added to a soup.
 Lentils with Spätzle and scalded sausage: a typical Swabian Spätzle dish.
 Milk Spätzle: together with boiled milk and eggs, the Spätzle provide a basis for a dessert with applesauce or boiled dried fruits. 
 Poppy Spätzle: Spätzle are roasted together with ground poppy seeds and sugar in a pan.
 “Pinzgauer Kasnockn”: a variant of cheese Spätzle in Salzburg, served with beer cheese from Pinzgau, a spicy and strong-smelling specialty.
 Ham Spätzle with cream sauce: Spätzle are mixed with a sauce consisting of boiled ham and cream.
 Spätzle with dried plums: a dessert with layers of Spätzle or rather “Knöpfle” as well as dried plums, which is refined with melted butter as wells as with sugar and cinnamon. 
 Spätzle casserole: Spätzle are mixed with ham and stewed cabbage and baked with cheese. 
 Spätzle stew: Spätzle are added to a meat and vegetable soup. 
 Spätzle Omelette: eggs and ham are fried together with Spätzle.
 Spätzle pancake: Spätzle or rather “Knöpfle” are roasted like potato pancakes.
 Spinach Spätzle: consist of a dough, to which finely chopped spinach, and just recently wild garlic, is added. It is served with bacon cubes or a sauce consisting of ham and cream.
 “Troffi”: consist of a dough, which is additionally dosed with pesto. This variant is resident in Upper Italy.
 Onion Spätzle: crushed onions are added to the dough.

Protected Appellation of Origin
Since March 2012, Schwäbische Spätzle and Schwäbische Knöpfle can be provided with the EU quality seal of "protected geographical indications" and are protected throughout Europe as regional speciality. In order to bear that seal, one of the production stages (processing or production) must have taken place in the region of provenance. For region of provenance of Schwäbische Spätzle and Schwäbische Knöpfle stand whole Baden-Württemberg as well as the Bavarian government district Schwaben.

Bibliography
 Siegfried Ruoß, Schwäbische Spätzlesküche, Stuttgart 2001, Konrad Theiss Verlag GmbH, 
 Roswitha Liebenstein, Alles über Allgäuer Spätzle, Kempten/Allgäu 2003, AVA Verlag Allgäu GmbH, 
 [Rosina Dorothea Knör, verwitwete Schmidlin, geb. Dertinger]: Sammlung vieler Vorschriften von allerley Koch- und Backwerk für junge Frauenzimmer, von einer Freundin der Kochkunst. [1. Auflage.] [Göppingen] 1783. ([Göppinger Kochbuch, 1].) [Enthält ein Rezept für Spätzle das manchen als frühestes bekanntes gilt.]
 [Rosina Dorothea Knör, verwitwete Schmidlin, geb. Dertinger]: Göppinger Kochbuch Zweyter Theil oder Neue Sammlung von Fastenspeisen und allerley Koch- und Backwerk für junges Frauenzimmer von einer Freundin der Kochkunst in Göppingen. Stuttgart, bey [Carl Christoph] Erhard und [Franz Christian] Löflund, 1790. (Göppinger Kochbuch, 2.)
 [Rosina Dorothea Knör, verwitwete Schmidlin, geb. Dertinger]: Neues Göppinger Kochbuch [Auszug]. Rezepte aus der 200 Jahre alten Sammlung vieler Vorschriften von allerley Koch- und Backwerk für junges Frauenzimmer von einer Freundin der Kochkunst in Göppingen. Ausgewählt und neu bearbeitet von Lilly Link und Ute Stumpp [...] und [mit] einem kulturgeschichtlichen Beitrag über das „Göppinger Kochbuch“ und seine Verfasserin von Karl-Heinz Rueß. Göppingen (1998) (Veröffentlichungen des Göppinger Stadtarchivs, Bd. 37). – 2. Auflage Göppingen 2000.

References

External links

 www.spaetzle.de

Pasta
Swabian cuisine